The Red Mark is a 1928 American silent melodrama film produced and directed by James Cruze and starring Gaston Glass. It was distributed through Pathé Exchange.

Cast
Nina Quartero as Zelie
Gaston Glass as Bibi-Ri
Gustav von Seyffertitz as De Nou
Rose Dione as Mother Caron
Luke Cosgrave as Papa Caron
Eugene Pallette as Sergeo
Jack Roper as Bombiste
Charles Dervis as The Lame Priest

Preservation status
The film is preserved in the Library of Congress Collection.

References

External links

1928 films
American silent feature films
Films directed by James Cruze
American black-and-white films
Films set on Devil's Island
Pathé Exchange films
1928 drama films
Silent American drama films
1920s American films
Films with screenplays by John Russell (screenwriter)